As of August 2022, 40 have been given the extraordinary privilege of the Commandant, Indonesian Marine Corps to become Honorary Marines (Warga Kehormatan Kormar TNI-AL) which include the wearing of the Marine Corps combat dress uniform and the magenta beret with the Corps Emblem.

References 

Indonesia
Indonesian military personnel